Laiuse is a small borough in Estonia. It is located in Jõgeva County and is a part of Jõgeva Parish. As of 2011 census, the settlement's population was 371.

Laiuse Middle School is one of the oldest in Estonia, being established in 1822.

Laiuse Church
Laiuse is the location of the medieval Laiuse Church. The church was first mentioned in 1319. In the church yard, there's an old lime tree, which was supposedly planted there by king Charles XII of Sweden during his visit in 1701.

Gallery

See also
Laiuse Romani
Laiuse Castle
Laiusevälja

References

Boroughs and small boroughs in Estonia
Castles of the Livonian Order
Kreis Dorpat